Troy Township is one of the fifteen townships of Ashland County, Ohio, United States. As of the 2010 census the population was 1,132.

Geography
Located in the northern part of the county, it borders the following townships:
Rochester Township, Lorain County - north
Huntington Township, Lorain County - northeast corner
Sullivan Township - east
Orange Township - south
Ruggles Township - west
New London Township, Huron County - northwest corner

No municipalities are located in Troy Township, although the unincorporated community of Nova is located in the center of the township.

Name and history
It is one of seven Troy Townships statewide.

The township was first surveyed in 1806, at which time the territory was composed of thick woods, but not officially organized or named until 1835. It was named for the dog of an early settler.

Troy Township was organized as part of Lorain County, and then it was added to Ashland County when it was formed on February 24, 1846 from portions of Huron, Lorain, Richland, and Wayne counties.

Government
The township is governed by a three-member board of trustees, who are elected in November of odd-numbered years to a four-year term beginning on the following January 1. Two are elected in the year after the presidential election and one is elected in the year before it. There is also an elected township fiscal officer, who serves a four-year term beginning on April 1 of the year after the election, which is held in November of the year before the presidential election. Vacancies in the fiscal officership or on the board of trustees are filled by the remaining trustees.

References

External links
Township website
County website

Townships in Ashland County, Ohio
1835 establishments in Ohio
Populated places established in 1835
Townships in Ohio